= Mintails mine =

Uranium mine in South Africa

- Location: Gauteng, South Africa
- Products: uranium

The Mintails mine is a large mine located in the northern part of South Africa in Gauteng. Mintails represents one of the largest uranium reserves in South Africa having estimated reserves of 210.3 million tonnes of ore grading 0.0046% uranium.
